John or Jack Robinson was a tenant of William Shakespeare in London, UK towards the end of the latter's life. This Robinson or another was also one of the witnesses to Shakespeare's will.

17th-century English people
People associated with Shakespeare